Walton Hall may refer to:

Walton Hall, Cheshire
Walton Hall, Chesterfield
 Walton Hall, Liverpool
Walton Hall Park in Liverpool
Walton Hall, Milton Keynes in Buckinghamshire
Walton Hall, Staffordshire
Walton Hall, Walton-on-Trent
Walton Hall, Warwickshire
Walton Hall, West Yorkshire

See also
Walton House (disambiguation)

Architectural disambiguation pages